Eric Xun Li, born Li Shimo (born 4 May 1968), is a Chinese venture capitalist and political scientist. He founded the Chinese news site Guancha.cn(观察者网), and has defended single party rule in China versus a multi-party system.

Early life and education
Li was born and raised in Shanghai. He went to the United States for higher education in the late 1980s. He received his BA in economics from the University of California, Berkeley, and an MBA from the Graduate School of Business at Stanford University. He also has a PhD in political science from Fudan University.

Business ventures
In 2000, Li returned to China and founded Chengwei Capital, with an investment portfolio of over $2 billion. Its top investments include Youku, an Internet-based television service, and Huazhu Hotels Group, a chain of Chinese budget hotels.

Views
In 2011, Li founded Guancha.cn, a digital news platform. Zihao Chen of University College London viewed the site as an online entity with "very conservative political attitudes".

In an op-ed he wrote for The New York Times in 2012, he said that China needed a different development framework around a different idea of modernity.

In a 2012 op-ed and a 2013 TED Talk, Li advocated for China's one-party state on the grounds of "pluralism", saying that China has prospered under a "meritocratic system" and alleviated poverty without elections, and that its system is superior to Western democracy in several respects. Some commentators have deemed Li's talk to be pro-China propaganda spread on a Western platform, using Western-style arguments and flexible rhetorics.

In a 2018 opinion piece he wrote for The Washington Post, Li argued it was "a good thing" that General Secretary of the Chinese Communist Party and paramount leader Xi Jinping abolished his two-term limits for governing the country. In a 2020 op-ed he wrote for Foreign Policy, Li said that Xi is a "good emperor". In a 2021 opinion piece he wrote for The Economist, Li criticized liberal democracy in favor of the "current Chinese government" (which he described as a different form of democracy).

In a 2020 interview with David Barboza, Eric Li described the China Policy of the Trump administration as an “irrational rivalry”, a competition in which the US is willing to hurt China even by hurting itself. He argued that global problems, such as climate change, nuclear proliferation, and the pandemic, have been neglected to a horrible degree due to the lack of cooperation between the two great powers. He hoped the Biden administration to moderate its hegemonic mindset and “bring about a period of calm” for both the US and China.

Affiliations
Li also serves on the board of directors of China Europe International Business School (CEIBS), the board of Stanford University's Graduate School of Business and the Freeman Spogli Institute (FSI). He is a trustee of Fudan University's China Institute, a trustee of the Berkeley Art Museum and Pacific Film Archive of the University of California, Berkeley, a trustee of the San Francisco Symphony, a trustee of Asia Society Hong Kong, a member of the international board of the New York Philharmonic, a member of the Council of the International Institute for Strategic Studies (IISS), which organizes the annual Shangri-La Dialogue.

References

Further reading

External links

1968 births
Living people
21st-century Chinese businesspeople
21st-century Chinese scientists
Businesspeople from Shanghai
Chinese political scientists
Chinese venture capitalists
Fudan University alumni
Scientists from Shanghai
Stanford Graduate School of Business alumni
University of California, Berkeley alumni